Carl McArthur Tuckett (born 18 May 1970) is a West Indian former cricketer who played one One Day International (ODI) in 1998. He represented Leeward Islands in the West Indian domestic circuit. He is a right arm medium fast bowler. In his only ODI, he had figures of 2 wickets for 41 runs from 8 overs against England at Queen's Park Oval, Port-Of-Spain, Trinidad, on 8 April 1998. In that match, he dismissed Alec Stewart and Graeme Hick.

Following his career as a player, he is now an umpire and stood in the tour matches between St Kitts Invitational XI against an England XI in April 2015. He made his first-class umpiring debut in November 2015, umpiring a game between the Leeward Islands and Trinidad and Tobago during the 2015–16 Regional Four Day Competition. In October 2016 he was selected as one of the eight umpires to stand in matches in the 2016 ICC World Cricket League Division Four tournament.

References

External links

1970 births
Living people
West Indies One Day International cricketers
Nevisian cricketers
West Indian cricketers of 1970–71 to 1999–2000
West Indian cricketers of the 21st century
Saint Kitts and Nevis cricket umpires